The 92nd Pennsylvania House of Representatives District is located in South Central Pennsylvania and has been represented by Dawn Keefer since 2017.

District profile
The 92nd District is located in York County and includes the following areas: 

Carroll Township
 Dillsburg
Dover Township (part)
District 02
 Fairview Township
 Franklintown
 Franklin Township
 Goldsboro
 Lewisberry
 Monaghan Township
 Newberry Township
 Warrington Township
 Washington Township
 Wellsville
York Haven

Representatives

References

Government of Cumberland County, Pennsylvania
Government of York County, Pennsylvania
92